Ismail Mahmoud Hurre (Buubaa) (born 1943?) was the foreign minister of the Transitional Federal Government of Somalia, from mid-2006 to early 2007. He was appointed to that position on August 21, 2006. He previously served as foreign minister from 2000 to 2002, during the beginning of the transitional government.

References 

1940s births
Living people
Government ministers of Somalia